Chicoreus banksii, common name the Banks' murex, is a species of sea snail, a marine gastropod mollusk in the family Muricidae, the murex snails or rock snails.

Description
The size of an adult shell varies between 55 mm and 107 mm.
It is very similar in physical appearance to Chicoreus palmarosae, the Rose Branch Murex.

Distribution
This species occurs in the Pacific Ocean along the Philippines, the Solomons, New Caledonia and Australia.

References

 Merle D., Garrigues B. & Pointier J.-P. (2011) Fossil and Recent Muricidae of the world. Part Muricinae. Hackenheim: Conchbooks. 648 pp. page(s): 103

External links
 

Gastropods described in 1841
Chicoreus